The Carl Sagan Prize for Science Popularization is an annual $5,000 award presented in honor of the late scientist Carl Sagan by Wonderfest, the San Francisco Bay Area Beacon of Science, to a scientist who has "contributed mightily to the public understanding and appreciation of science."

The scientist receiving the prize must be a resident of one of the nine San Francisco Bay Area counties, and have "a history of accomplishment in scientific research." Though administered by nonprofit Wonderfest, the Sagan Prize was funded by Google in 2015, and by Annual Reviews in 2002 through 2010. (Lack of funding inhibited presentation of the Prize in the intervening years, 2011-2014.)

Sagan Prize recipients

The following have received the Carl Sagan Prize:

 2002 — Andrew Fraknoi, Professor of Astronomy, Foothill College
 2003 — Kevin Padian, Professor of Integrative Biology, University of California, Berkeley
 2004 — Alex Filippenko, Professor of Astronomy, University of California, Berkeley
 2005 — Jill Tarter, Director, Center for SETI Research, SETI Institute
 2006 — Paul Berg, Professor of Biochemistry, Stanford University
 2007 — Keith Devlin, Executive Director, Human-Sciences and Technologies Advanced Research Institute, Stanford
 2008 — Robert Sapolsky, Professor of Biology and Neurology, Stanford University
 2009 — Geoff Marcy, Professor of Astronomy, University of California, Berkeley
 2010 — Donald Kennedy, Emeritus President and Professor of Environmental Science, Stanford University
 2015 — Seth Shostak, Senior Astronomer and Director, Center for SETI Research, SETI Institute
 2016 — Gibor Basri, Professor of the Graduate School, Professor Emeritus of Astronomy, University of California, Berkeley
2017 — Jennifer A. Doudna, Professor of Chemistry and of Molecular & Cell Biology, University of California, Berkeley
2018 — Peter Gleick, Co-founder, President-emeritus, Pacific Institute
2019 — Dan Werthimer, Co-founder and Chief Scientist, Berkeley SETI Research Center
2020 — Matthew Walker, sleep researcher, University of California, Berkeley
 2021 — Alison Gopnik

Wonderfest's Sagan Prize Selection Committee recommends each year's recipient to Wonderfest's Board of Directors, and the Board then formally confirms (or rejects) the recommendation. Wonderfest's long-term goal in presenting the Sagan Prize is to encourage science researchers to make science insights accessible to the general public — thereby promoting the scientific outlook and enlarging the concept of "scientific community."

References

External links
 Carl Sagan Prize for Science Popularization information from Wonderfest

Awards established in 2002
American science and technology awards
Science and technology in the San Francisco Bay Area
Education in the San Francisco Bay Area
Carl Sagan